Kristopher Rudy-Charles Jenkins (born August 3, 1979) is a former American football defensive tackle who played for the Carolina Panthers and New York Jets of the National Football League (NFL). He played college football for the University of Maryland. He was drafted by the Panthers in the second round of the 2001 NFL Draft. A two-time All-Pro and four-time Pro Bowl selection, Jenkins played seven seasons for the Panthers before being traded to the New York Jets in 2008.

College career
Jenkins played college football at the University of Maryland, where he started 27 of 41 games.  He made the second-team All-ACC during his senior season.  He finished with 9.5 sacks and 154 tackles.

Professional career

2001 NFL Draft
Jenkins was selected in the second round of the 2001 NFL Draft by Carolina.

Carolina Panthers (2001–2007)
Jenkins finished the 2002 season with 60 tackles and 7 sacks, en route to an alternate appearance on the NFC's Pro Bowl team, where he replaced an injured Warren Sapp.  The following season, he helped the Panthers on their way to Super Bowl XXXVIII.  In one game against the Tampa Bay Buccaneers, Jenkins blocked two kicks: a field goal attempt by Martin Gramatica, and an extra point attempt that would have won the game.  Jenkins' second block marked the first time that an extra point was blocked to send a game into overtime (Carolina later won the game).  Jenkins was rewarded with his first Pro Bowl start, and joined teammate Mike Rucker as half of the NFC's defensive front line.

However, the 2004 NFL season saw Jenkins suffer a shoulder injury in the second game against Kansas City, and he spent the latter half of the season on injured reserve. His injuries continued during the first game of the 2005 NFL season when he tore his anterior cruciate ligament and was once again placed on injured reserve.

New York Jets (2008–2010)
On February 29, 2008, the Carolina Panthers traded Jenkins to the New York Jets for third- and fifth-round draft picks in the 2008 NFL Draft. The Panthers selected Charles Godfrey and Gary Barnidge with the traded picks. For much of his first season with the Jets, Jenkins was dominant and garnered heavy consideration for the NFL's Defensive Player of the Year award. On Sunday October 18, 2009, Jenkins left the game against the Buffalo Bills with a left knee injury. The next day, it was reported that he had a torn ACL and would be out for the rest of the season. During the home opener against the Baltimore Ravens on September 13, 2010, Jenkins was injured as he twisted his leg making a tackle. A few days later, an MRI revealed that Jenkins had again torn his ACL and was out for the rest of the 2010 season.

The Jets released Jenkins on February 28, 2011.

Retirement
Jenkins announced his retirement from football on July 20, 2011.

NFL career statistics

Regular season

Personal life
Prior to the 2011 NFL Season, Jenkins joined SNY as an analyst for New York Jets. His job included appearing on Jets programs such as pre-game and post-game shows and Jets Game Plan. He is the older brother of former defensive end, Cullen Jenkins.

References

External links
New York Jets bio
Carolina Panthers bio
Maryland Terrapins bio

Sportspeople from Ypsilanti, Michigan
American Conference Pro Bowl players
African-American players of American football
American football defensive tackles
Maryland Terrapins football players
Carolina Panthers players
National Conference Pro Bowl players
New York Jets players
1979 births
Living people
American people of Welsh descent
21st-century African-American sportspeople
20th-century African-American sportspeople